The following is a list of songs written about Bangalore, the capital city of Karnataka province of India:

"Naam Ooru Bengaluru" - a song sung by Gopi Sunder from the Malayalam film Bangalore Days
"The Bangalore Song" 
"Ringa Ringa" - a song sung by Priya Himesh from Telugu film Arya 2, mentions in middle first verse "Bengalooru Telinaru Mangalooru Telinaru"
"Bengalooru Mangalooru" - a song sung by Puneeth Rajkumar from Bindaas.
Bangalore - a song by Thomas Itty (available to stream on Spotify, Apple Music, You Tube, etc.)

References

Bangalore
Culture of Karnataka
Songs about India
Songs